Jesus People: The Movie is a 2009 American comedy movie directed by Jason Naumann and starring Edi Patterson, Mindy Sterling and Wendi McLendon-Covey.

Plot

Cast
 Joel McCrary as Pastor Jerry Frank
 Edi Patterson as Gloria Hamming
 Damon Pfaff as Zak Crowner
 Richard Pierre-Louis as Ty Raney
 Lindsay Stidham as Cara Bosch
 Mindy Sterling as Claudia
 Wendi McLendon-Covey as Jenna Bosch
 Octavia Spencer as Angel Angelique

References

External links
 

American comedy films
2009 comedy films
2009 films
2000s English-language films
2000s American films